In probability theory, the Girsanov theorem tells how stochastic processes change under changes in measure. The theorem is especially important in the theory of financial mathematics as it tells how to convert from the physical measure which describes the probability that an underlying instrument (such as a share price or interest rate) will take a particular value or values to the risk-neutral measure which is a very useful tool for evaluating the value of derivatives on the underlying.

History
Results of this type were first proved by Cameron-Martin in the 1940s and by Igor Girsanov in 1960.  They have been subsequently extended to more general classes of process culminating in the general form of Lenglart (1977).

Significance
Girsanov's theorem is important in the general theory of stochastic processes since it enables the key result that if Q is a measure that is absolutely continuous with respect to P then every P-semimartingale is a Q-semimartingale.

Statement of theorem
We state the theorem first for the special case when the underlying stochastic process is a Wiener process. This special case is sufficient for risk-neutral pricing in the Black–Scholes model.

Let  be a Wiener process on the Wiener probability space . Let  be a measurable process adapted to the natural filtration of the Wiener process ; we assume that the usual conditions have been satisfied. 

Given an adapted process  define

where  is the stochastic exponential of X with respect to W, i.e. 

 

and  denotes the quadratic variation of the process X.

If  is a martingale then a probability 
measure Q can be defined on  such that Radon–Nikodym derivative 

Then for each t the measure Q restricted to the unaugmented sigma fields  is equivalent to P restricted to

Furthermore if  is a local martingale under P then the process

is a Q local martingale on the filtered probability space .

Corollary
If X is a continuous process and W is Brownian motion under measure P then

is Brownian motion under Q.

The fact that  is continuous is trivial; by Girsanov's theorem it is a Q local martingale, and by computing 

it follows by Levy's characterization of Brownian motion that this is a Q Brownian
motion.

Comments
In many common applications, the process X is defined by

For X of this form then a necessary and sufficient condition for X to be a martingale is Novikov's condition which requires that

The stochastic exponential  is the process Z which solves the stochastic differential equation

Additionally, then combining this above observation in this case, we see that the process

This was Igor Girsanov's original formulation of the above theorem.

Application to finance
This theorem can be used to show in the Black–Scholes model the unique risk-neutral measure, i.e. the measure in which the fair value of a derivative is the discounted expected value, Q, is specified by

Application to Langevin equations 
Another application of this theorem, also given in the original paper of Igor Girsanov, is for stochastic differential equations. Specifically, let us consider the equation

where  denotes a Brownian motion. In this case Girsanov's theorem may be used to compute functionals of  directly in terms a related functional for Brownian motion. More specifically, we have for any bounded functional  on continuous functions  that

This follows by applying Girsanov's theorem, and the above observation, to the martingale process

In particular, we note that with the notation above, the process

is a Q Brownian motion. Rewriting this in differential form as

A more general form of this application is that if both

 

See also

References

External links
 Notes on Stochastic Calculus which contain a simple outline proof of Girsanov's theorem.

Stochastic processes
Mathematical theorems
Mathematical finance